Tiziana Cantone, name subsequently legally changed to "Tiziana Giglio" (July 15, 1983, Casalnuovo di Napoli, Italy – September 13, 2016, Casalnuovo di Napoli), was an Italian woman who committed suicide after the spread on the web of some of her amateur pornographic videos.

In a bid to make her ex-boyfriend jealous, she sent videos of herself engaging in consensual sex acts with a new boyfriend to several people, including her ex-boyfriend, via the WhatsApp messaging service. Her ex-boyfriend subsequently uploaded the videos to public internet sites in early 2015. One such video went viral due to her reaction with the words "Are you filming? Good!"  (Italian: Stai facendo un video? Bravo!) when being filmed performing fellatio in front of a car. The phrase appeared on t-shirts, smartphone cases and other paraphernalia. 

She fought a legal case over the right to be forgotten, which led to the videos being removed from numerous EU websites. However, she was also ordered to pay 20,000 euros in legal costs. She legally changed her name and moved to a new city in attempts to avoid the publicity generated by the videos. She was initially thought to have  hanged herself to a fitness tool located in a canteen of her home on 13 September 2016, but new evaluation of DNA evidence has led prosecutors to order her body exhumed for re-examination in suspicion of murder.

 her mother Maria Teresa Giglio still fights to remove the video from the Internet.

See also
 Bullying
 Cyberbullying
 Revenge porn

References

1983 births
2016 suicides
People from Naples
Suicides by hanging in Italy
Victims of cyberbullying
2016 deaths